The Palawan shrew (Crocidura palawanensis) is a species of mammal in the family Soricidae. It is endemic to the Philippines and known from Palawan and Balabac Islands, from sea level to  asl. It occurs in old growth and scrubby secondary forest.

References

Crocidura
Mammals of the Philippines
Endemic fauna of the Philippines
Fauna of Palawan
Mammals described in 1934
Taxonomy articles created by Polbot